The Echigo Mountains are a mountain range that straddle Niigata, Fukushima, and Gunma prefectures in Japan.

See also 

 Asahi Mountains (朝日山地)
 Iide Mountains (飯豊山地)
 Mikuni Mountains (三国山脈) 
 Taishaku Mountains (帝釈山脈)

References 

Mountain ranges of Niigata Prefecture
Mountain ranges of Fukushima Prefecture
Mountain ranges of Gunma Prefecture